Albert Fox (20 April 1867 – 24 December 1946) was an Australian cricketer. He played one first-class cricket match for Victoria in 1899.

See also
 List of Victoria first-class cricketers

References

External links
 

1867 births
1946 deaths
Australian cricketers
Victoria cricketers
Cricketers from Hobart